The Crime and Disorder Act 1998 (c.37) is an Act of the Parliament of the United Kingdom. The Act was published on 2 December 1997 and received Royal Assent in July 1998. Its key areas were the introduction of Anti-Social Behaviour Orders, Sex Offender Orders, Parenting Orders, granting local authorities more responsibilities with regards to strategies for reducing crime and disorder, and the introduction of law specific to 'racially aggravated' offences. The Act also abolished rebuttable presumption that a child is doli incapax (the presumption that a person between ten and fourteen years of age is incapable of committing an offence) and formally abolished the death penalty for the last civilian offences carrying it, namely treason and piracy.

The bill had also included changes to change the age of consent for homosexual acts from 18 to 16; however, this was removed by the House of Lords and was eventually passed in the Sexual Offences Act two years later.

Main provisions

Anti-Social Behaviour Orders

The Act introduced a civil remedy called the anti-social behaviour order (or ASBO). These orders are made against people who have engaged in anti-social behaviour, which is defined as "conduct which caused or was likely to cause alarm, harassment, or distress to one or more persons not of the same household as him or herself and where an ASBO is seen as necessary to protect relevant persons from further anti-social acts by the Defendant".

In England and Wales, the orders were made by the magistrates' courts; in Scotland, they are still made by the sheriff courts. The provisions of the 1998 Act have since been modified by the Anti-social Behaviour Act 2003; they were abolished in England and Wales in 2014.

Sex Offender Orders
In England and Wales, a Sex Offender Order is a similar concept to the Anti-Social Behaviour Order with the key difference being that it is specifically aimed at those people in society that are deemed "sex offenders". The Act allows a police officer to approach the magistrates' court and show that they have reasonable cause to believe that there is a need for an order to be made to protect the public from harm. The conditions placed in such an order are those that are needed to prevent harm to the public. The order can be made for a minimum of 5 years unless the court upholds a complaint for the order to be varied or discharged.

A breach of a Sex Offender Order renders the person to which the order applies liable for imprisonment, on summary conviction, for up to six months, or on conviction on indictment, up to five years and/or a fine.

The act only applies to those people that are defined as a 'sex offender' per Section 3(1) of the act, namely that the person has been convicted of an offence that is subject to notification requirements (as specified in Part I of the Sex Offenders Act 1997); was found not guilty as a result of insanity; or has been cautioned for such an offence and at the time admitted it or has been convicted of a similar offence in any country outside of the United Kingdom and the offence would have been deemed a sexual offence under UK law.

Parenting Orders

In England and Wales, a Parenting Order is an order made against the parent(s) of a child which has been given an Anti-Social Behaviour Order, has been convicted of an offence, or the parent has been convicted of an offence under section 443 or 444 of the Education Act 1996 (i.e. failure to prevent truancy). Its aim is that parents must adhere to the conditions to stop their child from behaving similarly; failure to do so will lead to their conviction. The order can be made for a period not exceeding 12 months. There are restrictions on orders being made that interfere with the parents' or child's religious beliefs or that interfere with the times which the parent normally attends work or an educational institution. If the parenting order is breached, the parent(s) could be liable to a fine, not exceeding level 3 on the standard scale.

Racially or religiously aggravated offences

In England and Wales, Sections 28 to 32 of the Act create separate offences for crimes that were aggravated by the victim's race or religion or presumed race or religion. They did not originally apply to crimes that are aggravated by the offender's perception of the victim's membership of a religion but it was amended by section 39 of the Anti-terrorism, Crime and Security Act 2001.

Racially or religiously aggravated assaults

Serious violent offences 

Section 29(1)(a) creates the distinct offence of racially or religiously aggravated wounding or infliction of bodily harm. A person is guilty of this offence if he commits an offence under section 20 of the Offences Against the Person Act 1861 (see grievous bodily harm) which is racially or religiously aggravated within the meaning of section 28.

Section 29(1)(b) creates the distinct offence of racially or religiously aggravated assault occasioning actual bodily harm. A person is guilty of this offence if they commit an offence under section 47 of the Offences against the Person Act 1861 (see assault occasioning actual bodily harm) which is racially or religiously aggravated within the meaning of section 28.

A person guilty of either of these offences is liable on conviction on indictment to imprisonment for a term not exceeding seven years, or to a fine, or to both, or on summary conviction to imprisonment for a term not exceeding six months, or to a fine not exceeding the statutory maximum, or to both (s.29(2)).

Common assault

Section 29(1)(c) creates the distinct offence of racially or religiously aggravated common assault. A person is guilty of this offence if he commits a common assault which is racially or religiously aggravated within the meaning of section 28.

This offence is triable either way.

A person guilty of this offence is liable on conviction on indictment to imprisonment for a term not exceeding two years, or to a fine, or to both, or on summary conviction to imprisonment for a term not exceeding six months, or to a fine not exceeding the statutory maximum, or to both (s.29(3)).

Racially or religiously aggravated criminal damage 

Section 30(1) creates the distinct offence of racially or religiously aggravated criminal damage. A person is guilty of this offence if he commits an offence under section 1(1) of the Criminal Damage Act 1971 (see also criminal damage) which is racially or religiously aggravated within the meaning of section 28.

A person guilty of this offence is liable on conviction on indictment to imprisonment for a term not exceeding fourteen years, or to a fine, or to both, or on summary conviction to imprisonment for a term not exceeding six months, or to a fine not exceeding the statutory maximum, or to both (s.30(2)).

Racially or religiously aggravated public order offences

Fear or provocation of violence and intentional harassment, alarm or distress

Section 31(1)(a) creates the distinct offence of racially or religiously aggravated fear or provocation of violence. A person is guilty of this offence if he commits an offence under section 4 of the Public Order Act 1986 (see fear or provocation of violence) which is racially or religiously aggravated within the meaning of section 28.

Section 31(1)(b) creates the distinct offence of racially or religiously aggravated intentional harassment, alarm or distress. A person is guilty of this offence if he commits an offence under section 4A of the Public Order Act 1986 (see intentional harassment, alarm or distress) which is racially or religiously aggravated within the meaning of section 28.

A person guilty of either of these offences is liable on conviction on indictment to imprisonment for a term not exceeding two years, or to a fine, or to both, or on summary conviction to imprisonment for a term not exceeding six months, or to a fine not exceeding the statutory maximum, or to both (s.31(4)).

Harassment, alarm or distress

Section 31(1)(c) creates the distinct offence of racially or religiously aggravated harassment, alarm or distress. A person is guilty of this offence if he commits an offence under section 5 of the Public Order Act 1986 (see harassment, alarm or distress) which is racially or religiously aggravated within the meaning of section 28.

A person guilty of this offence is liable on summary conviction to imprisonment for a term not exceeding six months, or to a fine not exceeding level 4 on the standard scale (s.29(3)).

Arrest

Sections 31(2) and (3) formerly provided a statutory power of arrest for offences under section 31(1). They were repealed by section 174 of, and Part 2 of Schedule 17 to, the Serious Organised Crime and Police Act 2005.

Racially or religiously aggravated harassment etc.

Harassment

A person is guilty of an offence under section 32(1)(a) if he commits an offence under section 2 of the Protection from Harassment Act 1997 which is racially or religiously aggravated within the meaning of section 28.

A person guilty of this offence is liable on conviction on indictment to imprisonment for a term not exceeding two years, or to a fine, or to both, or on summary conviction to imprisonment for a term not exceeding six months, or to a fine not exceeding the statutory maximum, or to both (s.32(3)).

Putting people in fear of violence

A person is guilty of an offence under section 32(1)(b) if he commits an offence under section 4 of the Protection from Harassment Act 1997 which is racially or religiously aggravated within the meaning of section 28.

A person guilty of this offence is liable on conviction on indictment to imprisonment for a term not exceeding seven years, or to a fine, or to both, or on summary conviction to imprisonment for a term not exceeding six months, or to a fine not exceeding the statutory maximum, or to both (s.32(4)).

In Scotland, Section 33 amended the Criminal Law (Consolidation) (Scotland) Act 1995 by inserting a new section 50A. This creates the offence of racially aggravated harassment.

Local authority responsibilities

Each Local Authority in England and Wales was given the responsibility to formulate and implement a strategy to reduce crime and disorder in their area.  The Act also requires the local authority to work with every police authority, probation authority, Strategic health authority, social landlords, the voluntary sector, and local residents and businesses.  Known as Crime and Disorder Reduction Partnerships (CDRPs) in England, and Community Safety Partnerships (CSPs) in Wales, the Home Office may require any Partnership to supply details of their community safety arrangements.

Other provisions
Section 34 of the Act abolished the rebuttable presumption that a child (defined as a person under fourteen but over the age of ten) is incapable of committing an offence (doli incapax). Section 36 of the Act abolished the death penalty for all offences of treason and for the offence of piracy with violence (under the Piracy Act 1837), replacing it with a maximum sentence of life imprisonment (with effect from 30 September 1998).

Case law

On 28 February 2007, the House of Lords ruled that use of the expletive "bloody foreigner" amounted to racial abuse under the Act, and held that the legal definition of "racial group" went beyond colour, race or ethnic origin to include nationality, citizenship and national origin – even if they were not specified in the words used by the offender. Baroness Hale stated that such conduct was not only deeply hurtful, damaging and disrespectful to the victim, but also to the community as a whole "by denying acceptance to members of certain groups not for their own sake but for the sake of something they can do nothing about".

See also
Capital punishment in the United Kingdom
High treason in the United Kingdom
Hate crime

References

The Crime and Disorder Act 1998, as amended, from the National Archives.

Public Order Act 1986 

WikiCrimeLine Racially and Religiously Aggravated Crime
WikiCrimeLine:  Crime and Disorder Act 1998 as amended by Police Reform Act 2002

Further reading

Card, R. and Ward, R. The Crime and Disorder Act 1998. Bristol: Jordans, 1998.
Padfield, N. A Guide to the Crime and Disorder Act 1998. London: Butterworths, 1998.

United Kingdom Acts of Parliament 1998
Sex laws
Hate crime
Anti-social behaviour
Court orders
Criminal law of the United Kingdom